Bank Asia Limited is a private sector commercial bank in Bangladesh. Areef Billah Adil Chowdhury is the President and Managing Director of the bank. Romo Rouf Chowdhury, chairman of Rancon Group, is the chairman of Bank Asia Limited.

History
The Bank was established as a private commercial bank on 28 September 1999, and incorporated in 1999. it expanded through the purchase of the branches of Bank of Nova Scotia and Muslim Commercial Bank Limited. In 2001, it purchased the operations of Scotiabank which entered Bangladesh in 1999.

Bank Asia relocated its Nova Scotia branch from Bijoy Sarani to Kazi Nazrul Islam avenue. It signed an agreement with Dutch-Bangla Bank Limited to have access to their automated teller machine network.

In 2008, Bank Asia announced a 25 per cent stock dividends. The bank also introduced Islamic banking.

Bank Asia was awarded third prize in corporate governance disclosures and achieved certificate of merit under integrated reporting category in the 17th ICAB National Award for BPAR-2016. The Anti-Corruption Commission arrested two officials of Bank Asia on embezzlement charges from Chittagong in May over a 760 million taka loan.

Bank Asia was awarded the Intellectual Property Protection Award in 2020 by the Bangladesh Copyright Board. It arranged a seven billion taka loan for Bashundhara Group to build a cement plant. A Rouf Chowdhury, chairman of Rangs Group, was re-elected chairman of the bank in May 2021. A former managing director of Bank Asia was implicated in the PK Halder scam.

In August 2022, Adil Chowdhury was appointed managing director of Bank Asia Limited. The Bank distributed loans to 220 women farmers in June.

References

Banks of Bangladesh
Banks established in 1991
Banks of Bangladesh with Islamic banking services
1999 establishments in Bangladesh
Organisations based in Dhaka